The Italian Power Exchange or IPEX, managed by  (or GME in Italian) is  the exchange for electricity and natural gas spot trading in Italy.

History
It was established by the Italian legislature on 16 March 1999 and issued general rules on 8 May 2001.

Markets
IPEX comprises the following spot markets:
 Day Ahead (In Italian Mercato del Giorno Prima, MGP)
 Intra Day (In Italian Mercato Infragiornaliero, MI), which since 10 February 2015 is composed of seven sessions (MI1, MI2, MI3, MI4, MI5, MI6 and MI7).

See also 
 European Energy Exchange (EEX) in Germany
 Powernext in France

External links
 EXAA - Energy Exchange Austria
 Mercato Elettrico - English home page
 Italian Electricity Market Rules
 Gestore dei Mercati Energetici
 Energy forecasting of price and demand for IPEX

Energy in Italy